Curtitoma neymanae is a species of sea snail, a marine gastropod mollusk in the family Mangeliidae.

Description
The length of the shell varies between 6 mm and 7 mm.

Distribution
This marine species occurs in the Sea of Japan

References

 BOGDANOV, IP. "7 NEW SPECIES OF SUBFAMILY OENOPOTINAE FROM THE OKHOTSK SEA." ZOOLOGICHESKY ZHURNAL 68.11 (1989): 147–152.

External links
  Tucker, J.K. 2004 Catalog of recent and fossil turrids (Mollusca: Gastropoda). Zootaxa 682:1-1295.
 Gulbin, Vladimir V. "Review of the Shell-bearing Gastropods in the Russian Waters of the East Sea (Sea of Japan). III. Caenogastropoda: Neogastropoda." The Korean Journal of Malacology 25.1 (2009): 51-70

neymanae
Gastropods described in 1989